The 1912 Nobel Prize in Literature was awarded to the German dramatist and novelist Gerhart Hauptmann (1862–1949) "primarily in recognition of his fruitful, varied and outstanding production in the realm of dramatic art." He is the fourth German author to become a recipient of the prize after Paul Heyse in 1910.

Laureate

Gerhart Hauptmann achieved prominence as one of the pioneers of German Naturalism. Naturalism emphasizes observation and determinism as key concepts. Vor Sonnenaufgang ("Before Sunrise"), a drama he wrote in 1889, launched his career and received critical acclaim at the same time and was followed by other successful plays such as Die Weber ("The Weaver", 1892), Hanneles Himmelfahrt ("The Assumption of Hannele", 1893), and Die versunkene Glocke ("The Sunken Bell", 1896). Hauptmann was inspired by the discussion and quickly produced a series of works with realistic themes. He released Der Narr in Christo Emanuel Quint ("The Fool in Christ, Emanuel Quint)", his debut book, in 1910.

Deliberations

Nominations
Gerhart Huaptmann was nominated in 5 occasions (three in 1902 and one nomination in 1906). His nomination in 1912 was made Erich Schmidt (1853–1913), historian of literature and member of the Royal Prussian Academy of Sciences, which eventually led him to being awarded the prize. 

In total, the Nobel Committee of the Swedish Academy received 40 nominations for 30 individuals. The highest nominations was for Spanish novelist Benito Pérez Galdós with five nominations. Among the repeated nominees include Henry James, Thomas Hardy, George Bernard Shaw (awarded in 1925), William Chapman, Verner von Heidenstam (awarded in 1916, and Juhani Aho. Ten of the nominees were nominated first-time, among them Henri Bergson (awarded in 1927), Pencho Slaveykov, Sven Hedin, Carl Spitteler (awarded in 1919), Jean-Henri Fabre, Salvatore Farina, Benito Pérez Galdós, Adolf Frey, and James George Frazer. No female authors were nominated that year.

The authors Herman Bang, Robert Barr, Berta Behrens, Alexandre Bisson, Edward Wilmot Blyden, Felix Dahn, Louis de Gramont, Léon Dierx, Horace Howard Furness, Joseph Furphy, Jacques Futrelle, Girish Chandra Ghosh, Theodor Gomperz, George Grossmith, Bertha Jane Grundy, Mir Mosharraf Hossain, Alphonse Lemerre, Lie Kim Hok, Karl May, Gabriel Monod, Giovanni Pascoli, Rafael Pombo, Bolesław Prus, Addison Peale Russell, Bram Stoker, Aleksey Suvorin, and Victoria, Lady Welby died in 1912 without having been nominated for the prize. The Bulgarian poet Pencho Slaveykov died months before the announcement.

Notes

References

External links
Award ceremony speech by Hans Hildebrand nobelprize.org
1912 Banquet speech nobelprize.org

1912